Lanark was a provincial riding in Ontario, Canada, that was created for the 1934 election. In 1987 there was a minor redistribution and the riding was renamed to Lanark-Renfrew. It was abolished prior to the 1999 election. It was merged into the riding of Renfrew—Nipissing—Pembroke.

Boundaries
In 1933, in an austerity measure to mark the depression times, the province passed an update to the Representation Act that reduced the number of seats in the legislature from 112 to 90. The riding of Lanark was created from parts of Lanark North and Lanark South and consisted of the townships of Beckwith, Bathurst, Burgess North, Dalhousie, Darling, Drummond, Elmsley North, Lanark, Lavant, Montague, Pakenham, Ramsay, Sherbrooke North and Sherbrooke South. It also included the towns of Almonte, Carleton Place, Perth, and Smith's Falls and the village of Lanark.

Members of Provincial Parliament

References

Notes

Citations

Former provincial electoral districts of Ontario